Colin in Black & White is an American six-episode limited fictionalized drama series that premiered on Netflix on October 29, 2021.

In advance of the series premiere, the pilot episode received a preview screening in the Primetime program at the 2021 Toronto International Film Festival.

Premise
A dramatization of the teenage years of athlete Colin Kaepernick and the experiences that led him to become an activist.

An exploration of former NFL player Colin Kaepernick's high school years and experiences that led him to become an activist.

Cast
 Colin Kaepernick as Narrator (Voice)
 Jaden Michael as Colin Kaepernick
 Mary-Louise Parker as Teresa Kaepernick
 Nick Offerman as Rick Kaepernick

Episodes

Reception

The review aggregator website Rotten Tomatoes reported a 80% approval rating with an average rating of 6.9/10, based on 25 critic reviews. The website's critics consensus reads, "Black & Whites clunky format fumbles the fundamentals of storytelling, but this hybrid series nonetheless scores a touchdown in conveying Colin Kaepernick's truth." Metacritic, which uses a weighted average, assigned a score of 70 out of 100 based on 17 critics, indicating "generally favorable reviews".

Kristen Baldwin of Entertainment Weekly gave the series a B and described the series as "an uneven but ultimately edifying portrayal of the young athlete's coming of age as a biracial boy growing up in a predominantly white world."

Accolades
It was nominated for a Peabody Award in 2022.

References

External links

2021 American television series debuts
2021 American television series endings
2020s American drama television miniseries
American biographical series
English-language Netflix original programming
Television series about teenagers
Colin Kaepernick